The Cruise of the Cachalot is an 1898 semi-autobiographical travel narrative by Frank T. Bullen that depicts a whaling expedition from a seaman's perspective. After its initial publication, the book sold well amongst readers, and was well liked. The work was included on a number of early 20th century primary and secondary school reading lists, and Rudyard Kipling's letters include reference to his having read the work with his children.

Mention in popular culture: In the Canadian novel, Fifth Business, by Robertson Davies, set in 1908, the older brother, Willie, of the narrator, Dunstan Ramsay, is reading The Cruise of the "Cachalot" in an early domestic scene.

References

Further reading

External links
 

Books about whaling
1898 books